Pathinaaru is a 2011 Tamil-language romantic drama film written and directed by Sabapathy Dekshinamurthy, who previously directed the films V.I.P (1997), Punnagai Poove (2003) and A Aa E Ee (2009). It stars Shiva and Madhu Shalini. The film's background score and soundtrack was composed by Yuvan Shankar Raja. After being launched in October 2008 under the title 16, the film was shot for over one year, wrapping in early 2010. A year after completion, Kalaipuli S. Thanu bought the distribution rights and released the film on 28 January 2011 under his V. Creations banner. However, it was financially unsuccessful. Despite that, it was remade as Jolly Boy in Kannada language.

Plot 
Shiva (Shiva) and Indhu (Madhu Shalini) are college students who both fall in love with each other. However, Indhu's father Gopalakrishnan (Abhishek) and mother (Amritha) oppose their love as they do not trust love and try to convince Indhu for which she does not agree. One day, Indhu's mother gives a book titled "Pathinaru" and asks Shiva and Indhu to read so that they might change their opinions about love.

Now the story moves back to a village in 1980s which describes a teenage love between Gopi (Kishore Kumar) and Ilavarasi (Vinitha). Gopi is from a poor family, while Ilavarasi is from an affluent family in the same village. When her parents find out about their love, they try all means to separate them. Finally, Gopi and Ilavarasi decide to run away from the village, but they are caught by their parents.

Ilavarasi goes to the extent of abandoning her family and wealth for the sake of Gopi. She asks Gopi in front of villagers to buy her a saree with his income, so that she can wear that and leave the village as she does not want any of her ancestral wealth and she waits for Gopi's arrival. Gopi goes to a nearby town to earn some money so that he can buy her a saree, but he meets with an accident and goes unconscious. Gopi is saved by a lorry driver and is admitted in a hospital. He recovers after a few months and returns to the village to meet Ilavarasi, but is shocked to know that her wedding is on the same day with someone. Gopi is shocked and leaves the village with sorrows.

The book ends there, and Indhu's mother reveals that Gopi is none other than Indhu's father Gopalakrishnan. She also convinces Indhu that Gopi transformed into Gopalakrishnan, which made him successful in life rather than keep worrying about his failed love. Now, Indhu doubts the credibility of love and decides to accept her parents' words.

But Shiva tries to find the whereabouts of Ilavarasi and leaves to the village. After meeting many people, Shiva finds the place where Ilavarasi is currently and goes to meet her. He also takes Gopalakrishnan with him. Gopalakrishnan is shocked to see Ilavarasi (Kasthuri), who now runs an orphanage in the memory of Gopi. Gopalakrishnan gets to know that Ilavarasi did not agree for the wedding and came away from her family and till the time she lives with memory of Gopi. Gopalakrishnan feels guilty but understands the power of true love and decides to get Shiva and Indhu married.

Cast 
 Shiva as Shiva
 Madhu Shalini as Indhu Gopalakrishnan
 Abhishek as Gopalakrishnan
 Kishore Kumar as Teenage Gopalakrishnan
 Master Sanjay as Youngest Gopalakrishnan
 Kasthuri as Ilavarasi (Cameo appearance)
 Vinitha as Teenage Ilavarasi
 Baby Pooja as Youngest Ilavarasi
 Pandi as Sakkarai
 Amirtha as Indhu's mother
Darbuka Siva as Shiva's friend

Production 
With initial plans of releasing the film for Pongal 2009, the film was officially launched under the title 16 on 15 October 2008 at the office of the production company, Passion Movie Makers, who are stepping into film production with this project, Radio jockey-turned-actor Shiva, who rose to fame through his appearances in Chennai 600028 (2007) and Saroja (2008), revealed that he had signed this film after Chennai 600028 even, which commenced only after the release of his second film Saroja. Darbuka Siva, a percussionist in various bands, who also worked as a radio jockey together with Shiva, was signed for an important role as was the controversial director Velu Prabhakaran. The first schedule of film shooting started on 3 November 2008, when scenes involving Shiva, Darbuka Siva, and Madhu Shalini were shot across the East Coast Road in Tamil Nadu. Subsequently, shooting was held at various places including Chennai, Ooty and Kodaikanal. Despite being made on a low budget and featuring a relatively new cast, the film mired in development hell, with filming, which was supposed to be completed within two months, being carried on through entire 2009, and finished in January 2010 only. Following the completion, however, the film's release still got delayed further, since it also languished in post-production hell. However, noted film producer and distributor Kalaipuli S. Thanu, after watching a preview screening of the film, decided to take over the film's theatrical rights and distribute it under his V. Creations banner in entire Tamil Nadu.

Soundtrack 

The film score and soundtrack of Pathinaaru were composed by Shiva's friend Yuvan Shankar Raja, collaborating with Sabapathy again after Punnagai Poove in 2003. Notably, Yuvan Shankar worked for this film without receiving any remuneration as it would have overrun the film's whole budget. The soundtrack album, considered the highlight of the film, features four songs along with a theme music track. The songs were composed in 2008 and recorded later that year and the next year, with the album being ready for release by July 2009. For a song in the flashback portion of the film, Yuvan Shankar Raja made his brother Karthik Raja sing, which is the first solo song of him under Yuvan Shankar's direction. Apart from Karthik Raja, Yuvan Shankar Raja himself, along with Hariharan, Shankar Mahadevan, and Bela Shende have sung the songs. The soundtrack album was eventually released on 24 December 2010 in a small manner, with S. P. B. Charan and Samuthirakani being present along with the film crew. Prior and during the time of the film's audio launch, Yuvan Shankar Raja was featured on the film posters, by which the producer promoted the film and the album.

The album as well as the film score received very positive reviews and critical acclaim. Pavithra Srinivasan from Rediff cited that "'Yuvan's Musical' is worth a listen", further adding that Pathinaaru "might have plenty of Yuvan's signature tunes, but there are moments of appeal that give some depth to the album, and veer away from his template". In regards to the score, she wrote that it "fits the film and adds some depth to it." A review from Behindwoods described Pathinaarus music as "youthful and lovely to the ears", further claiming that "lovely orchestrations, right chords and soulful voices make Pathinaaru a worthy album to have in your collection." Times of India and Indiaglitz further addressed high praise to Yuvan Shankar Raja, with a critic from the former, N. Venkateswaran, noting that Yuvan was "in superb form in this romantic album both as composer and singer", while a review from the latter labelled Yuvan Shankar Raja as the "real hero of the movie", particularly lauding his score, citing that "his re-recording especially for the rural episode is mind-boggling."

References

External links 
 

2011 romantic drama films
2011 films
Tamil films remade in other languages
2010s Tamil-language films
Films scored by Yuvan Shankar Raja
Indian romantic drama films
Films shot in Ooty
Films shot in Chennai
Films shot in Kodaikanal
Films directed by Sabapathy Dekshinamurthy